The Dedalus Poppy is a homebuilt, single engine, single seat ultralight aircraft flown in Italy in the 1980s.  Several were built and flown; at least one remains on the Italian civil register in 2010.

Design and development

The Poppy is a conventionally laid out, single engine, high wing ultralight.  Its wings have constant chord and are braced with aluminium V struts  attached to the lower fuselage longerons.  The tailplane is mounted on top of the extreme rear of the tapered fuselage, with the elevators hinged beyond.  The fin is broad and straight tapered, carrying a straight edged rudder which ends above the tailplane.  The Poppy has a geodetic structure of Sitka spruce, covered with Dacron fabric apart from a glass fibre engine cowling.

The Poppy is powered by an 18.6 kW (25 hp) KFM 107E flat twin two-stroke engine.  Its single-seat cabin is under the wings.  It has a fixed, conventional undercarriage with mainwheels on cantilever legs attached to the lower fuselage.

The first flight was in May 1984.

Operational history
The Poppy was a homebuild aircraft, with kits available.  Build time was about 300 hrs. In 1992 "many" Poppys were flying, though by mid-2010 only one remained on the registers of European countries west of Russia.

Specifications

References

1980s Italian sport aircraft
High-wing aircraft
Aircraft first flown in 1984